The 2007 Wyoming Cowboys football team represented the University of Wyoming in the 2007 NCAA Division I FBS college football season. The Cowboys were led by head coach Joe Glenn and played their home games at War Memorial Stadium.

Schedule

References

Wyoming Cowboys
Wyoming Cowboys football seasons
Wyoming Cowboys football